Frank Wilson (1873–?), was a British actor, writer and film director. Wilson was a prolific director during the silent era, shooting well over 200 shorts and feature films. He worked at the pioneering Hepworth Pictures in Walton Studios and later at Broadwest of Walthamstow Studios.

Selected filmography

Director
 The Jewel Thieves Outwitted (1913)
 The Vicar of Wakefield (1913)
 A Cigarette-Maker's Romance (1913)
 The Heart of Midlothian (1914)
 Justice (1914)
 Her Boy (1915)
 The Nightbirds of London (1915)
 The White Boys (1916)
 The Grand Babylon Hotel (1916)
 A Bunch of Violets (1916)
 A Gamble for Love (1917)
 The Man Behind 'The Times' (1917)
 Her Marriage Lines (1917)
 The Woman Wins (1918)
 The Soul of Guilda Lois (1919)
 The Irresistible Flapper (1919)
 With All Her Heart (1920)

References

Bibliography
 Low, Rachael. The History of the British Film 1918–1929. George Allen & Unwin, 1971.

External links

Year of death unknown
1873 births
British male film actors
British film directors
British male screenwriters